Group B of the 1991 FIFA Women's World Cup took place from 17 to 21 November 1991. The group consisted of Brazil, Japan, Sweden and the United States.

Standings

Matches
All times listed are local, CST (UTC+8).

Japan vs Brazil

Sweden vs United States

Japan vs Sweden

Brazil vs United States

Japan vs United States

Brazil vs Sweden

References

External links
FIFA Women's World Cup China PR 1991, FIFA.com

1991 FIFA Women's World Cup
Brazil at the 1991 FIFA Women's World Cup
Japan at the 1991 FIFA Women's World Cup
Sweden at the 1991 FIFA Women's World Cup
United States at the 1991 FIFA Women's World Cup